Garden City is a neighborhood in Jacksonville, Florida, United States. Located in the Northside area, it has an estimated population of 1,940 people. Garden City is located in the vicinity of Florida State Road 104 and Florida State Road 115.

See also

Neighborhoods of Jacksonville
 Architecture of Jacksonville

References

Neighborhoods in Jacksonville, Florida
Northside, Jacksonville